Monkey gland sauce has its origins in South Africa. It has been featured as a restaurant item since the 1930s, becoming a South African restaurant and fast food staple condiment. It is a thick, sweet and tangy sauce and dark in colour. It is typically served as a topping for grilled steaks or burgers, but is also used as a marinade, a dipping sauce for onion rings and fries, or on roasted potatoes.

Ingredients 
The main components of monkey gland sauce are chutney and tomato sauce – which result in a sweet mixture. Then an addition of onions, vinegar, garlic and Worcestershire sauce, give it a savoury-sweet flavour

Naming 

Despite its name, the sauce does not contain any monkey glands.

There are various theories on the origins of the sauce but the most likely is that it originated with French chefs at the old Carlton Hotel in Johannesburg. South African diners added sauces such as chutney, tomato sauce, and Worcester sauce to the French dishes before eating it. Thus, the disgruntled chefs combined all the condiments to create a sauce which they named monkey gland sauce. There was speculation at the time that monkey glands could slow down ageing.

A more outlandish theory is that it was named after Russian-born French scientist, Dr Serge Abrahamovitch Voronoff, who was a regular visitor at the Savoy hotel in London. One of his medical experiments involved grafting monkey testicle tissue onto impotent men as a cure. The hotel renamed his favourite steak dish the "monkey gland steak" when he became famous. Then an ex-Savoy waiter brought it over to South Africa in the 1930s.

See also 
 Monkey Gland – cocktail
 List of dips
 List of sauces

Notes

References

 
 
 
 

Sauces
South African cuisine